Shanmugan Jegadhiswaran (also spelt Shanmugam Jegatheeswaran, Sanmugan Jegadeeswaran) is a Sri Lankan politician, a former member of the Parliament of Sri Lanka and a former government minister.

References

Year of birth missing (living people)
Living people
Members of the 13th Parliament of Sri Lanka
Government ministers of Sri Lanka
United People's Freedom Alliance politicians